Brändö is the name of several places:

Brändö, a municipality on Åland.
Brändö, (in Finnish: Kulosaari), a section of the city Helsingfors (Helsinki).
Brändö, (in Finnish: Palosaari), a section of the city Vasa (Vaasa).